Luis Córdoba Ronquillo, O.SS.T. also Luis de Córdoba y Ronquillo (died 24 November 1640) was a Roman Catholic prelate who served as Bishop of Trujillo (1640) and Bishop of Cartagena in Colombia (1630–1640).

Biography
Luis Córdoba Ronquillo was born in Granada, Spain and ordained a priest in the Order of the Most Holy Trinity and of the Captives.
On 9 September 1630, he was appointed during the papacy of Pope Urban VIII as Bishop of Cartagena in Colombia.
In April 1631, he was consecrated bishop by Bernardino de Almansa Carrión, Archbishop of Santo Domingo, with Luis Camargo Pacheco, Titular Bishop of Centuria, and Alonso Godina, Titular Bishop of Utica, serving as co-consecrators. 
On 14 April 1640, he was selected by the King of Spain as Bishop of Trujillo and confirmed by Pope Urban VIII on 13 August 1640.
He served as Bishop of Trujillo until his death on 24 November 1640.

While bishop, he was the principal consecrator of Agustín de Ugarte y Sarabia, Bishop of Chiapas (1631); and Cristóbal de Torres, Archbishop of Santafé en Nueva Granada (1635).

References

External links and additional sources
 (for Chronology of Bishops) 
 (for Chronology of Bishops) 
 (for Chronology of Bishops) 
 (for Chronology of Bishops) 

17th-century Roman Catholic bishops in New Granada
Bishops appointed by Pope Urban VIII
Roman Catholic bishops of Cartagena in Colombia
Date of birth unknown
1640 deaths
Trinitarian bishops
People from Granada
17th-century Roman Catholic bishops in Peru
Roman Catholic bishops of Trujillo